Duvenage is a surname. Notable people with the surname include:

Dewaldt Duvenage (born 1988), South African rugby union footballer
Wayne Duvenage (born 1960), South African businessman, entrepreneur, and civil activist

See also
 Duvenhage lyssavirus